Duck Creek is a tributary of the Ohio River, approximately 30 mi (50 km) long, in southeastern Ohio in the United States.  Via the Ohio River, it is part of the Mississippi River watershed.  It drains an area of the Unglaciated Allegheny Plateau, between the watersheds of the Muskingum and Little Muskingum Rivers.

Course
Duck Creek is formed in the hill country of northern Washington County at the community of Warner, just west of Lower Salem and approximately 15 mi (24 km) north of Marietta, by the confluence of East Fork Duck Creek and West Fork Duck Creek.  The East Fork, approximately 20 mi (30 km) long, rises in western Monroe County and flows generally southwardly through eastern Noble and northern Washington Counties. The West Fork, approximately 30 mi (50 km) long, rises in southeastern Guernsey County and flows generally south-southeastwardly through central Noble and northern Washington Counties, past the towns of Belle Valley, Caldwell, Dexter City and Macksburg; it is the larger of the two headwaters streams. From Warner, Duck Creek flows generally southwardly in a highly meandering course and joins the Ohio River at Marietta, about 3 mi (5 km) east of its downtown.

Flow rate

See also
List of rivers of Ohio

References

Rivers of Ohio
Tributaries of the Ohio River
Rivers of Noble County, Ohio
Rivers of Washington County, Ohio
Allegheny Plateau